The men's discus throw at the 1954 European Athletics Championships was held in Bern, Switzerland, at Stadion Neufeld on 26 and 28 August 1954.

Medalists

Results

Final
28 August

Qualification
26 August

Participation
According to an unofficial count, 23 athletes from 17 countries participated in the event.

 (1)
 (1)
 (1)
 (2)
 (2)
 (1)
 (2)
 (1)
 (1)
 (1)
 (2)
 (1)
 (2)
 (1)
 (1)
 (2)
 (1)

References

Discus throw
Discus throw at the European Athletics Championships